Passing may refer to:

Social identity 
 Passing (sociology), presenting oneself as a member of another sociological group
 Passing (gender), presenting oneself as being cisgender
 Passing (racial identity), presenting oneself as a member of another race

Literature and film
Passing (novel), a novel by Nella Larsen
Passing (film), directed by Rebecca Hall (2021), based on Larsen's novel

Math and technology
Message passing, a form of communication in computer science
Token passing, a channel access method in telecommunications 
Variational message passing, a mathematical technique for continuous-valued Bayesian networks

Sports

Passing (sports), to pass a ball or puck between members of the same team
Passing (American football) 
Passing (association football), or soccer
Passing (juggling), when two or more people share a juggling pattern

Transportation

 Passing, overtaking, the act of driving around a slower automobile
 Passing lane, a lane on a road for use while overtaking
 Passing loop, a section of railway where trains can pass each other

Other uses
 Buck passing, or passing the buck, transferring responsibility to another
 Passing away, euphemism for "dying"
 A syncope is an instance of passing out, also called fainting or losing consciousness
 Passing off, in law, presenting one product as another
 Passing, a type of metallic thread used in embroidery

See also
 Closeted (concealing one's sexual orientation or behavior)
 Pass (disambiguation)
 Passer (disambiguation)
 The Passing (disambiguation)